Dee Edwards may refer to:

 Dee Edwards (businesswoman), British entrepreneur
 Dee Edwards (singer) (1945–2006), American singer
 Norma Dee Edwards (1912–1994), American politician